Asad bin Jibrāʼīl Rustum Mujāʻiṣ (4 June 1897 – 23 June 1965) was a Lebanese historian, academic and writer. He published more than 15 books related to the history of the Middle East.

Life 
Rustum was born in Dhour El Choueir on 4 June 1897. He obtained his bachelor and master from the American University of Beirut in 1919, then PhD in History of the Middle East from the University of Chicago in 1923, then he went back to Beirut where he taught History of the Middle East at the American University of Beirut until his resignation in 1943. He received the Order of Civil Merit of the Syrian Arab Republic and the Lebanese order of merit in 1964.

Rustum died on 23 June 1965.

References

1897 births
People from Dhour El Choueir
University of Chicago alumni
American University of Beirut alumni
20th-century Lebanese historians
Eastern Orthodox Christians from Lebanon
Academic staff of the American University of Beirut
Recipients of the Order of Merit (Lebanon)
1965 deaths